Livingston is a masculine given name which may refer to:

 Livingston Allen (born 1991), Jamaican-American podcaster and YouTuber
 Livingston L. Biddle Jr. (1918–2002), American author and promoter of funding of the arts
 Livingston L. Holder Jr. (born 1956), retired United States Air Force astronaut and aerospace engineer
 Livingston T. Merchant (1903–1976), American diplomat and government official
 Livingston Middlemost (1839–1897), English cricketer
 Livingston Taylor (born 1950), American singer-songwriter and folk musician

See also
 Livingstone (name), a surname and given name

English-language masculine given names